Picture Pages is a 1978–1984 American educational television program aimed at preschool children, presented by Bill Cosby—teaching lessons on basic arithmetic, geometry, and drawing through a series of interactive lessons that used a workbook that viewers would follow along with the lesson.

Picture Pages was created by Julius Oleinick and started on a local Pittsburgh children's show in 1974 with the Picture Pages puzzle booklets given away at a supermarket chain. It debuted as a national segment of the Captain Kangaroo show in 1978 (then directed by Jimmy Hirschfeld), in which Captain Kangaroo would do the lessons on his "magic drawing board". Bill Cosby took over hosting the segments in 1980, presenting the lessons with a marker named "Mortimer Ichabod Marker" (M.I. for short), which was topped with a cartoon figure that played musical notes whenever he drew with it.

When the Captain Kangaroo show left CBS in 1984, the Cosby-era Picture Pages series was rerun as an interstitial program on Nickelodeon from 1984 to 1993.

The show also aired in Canada on the YTV cable network.

References

External links
 

1970s American children's television series
1970s preschool education television series
1974 American television series debuts
1980s American children's television series
1980s preschool education television series
1984 American television series endings
American preschool education television series
Culture of Pittsburgh